SS Harold O. Wilson was a Liberty ship built in the United States during World War II.

Construction
Harold O. Wilson was laid down on 12 December 1944, under a Maritime Commission (MARCOM) contract, MC hull 2396, by J.A. Jones Construction, Brunswick, Georgia; she was sponsored by Mrs. J.S. Bragdon, and launched on 12 January 1945.

History
On 3 November 1945, one of the first US locomotives for the French railroad system was unloaded from Harold O. Wilson in Marseille.

She was allocated to the United States Navigation Company, on 24 January 1945. On 20 June 1947, she was sold to Northeastern Steamship Corp., and renamed North Beacon. In April 1955, she was sold to Bethlehem Steel, and renamed Texmar. In January 1961, she was wrecked and sold for scrapping.

References

Bibliography

 
 
 
 
 

 

Liberty ships
Ships built in Brunswick, Georgia
1945 ships